Robert Warren Brannum (May 28, 1925 – February 5, 2005) was an American basketball player.

A 6'5" center from Winfield, Kansas, Brannum attended the University of Kentucky and Michigan State before playing professional basketball.

Brannum was named to the 1943 first team "All American" in his senior year at Winfield (Kansas) High School, and his twin brother Clarence was named to the second team at the same time. 

Brannum spent his first three professional seasons with the Sheboygan Red Skins, whose pro roots dated from 1938, the second season of the National Basketball League. Brannum started all three seasons, during which Sheboygan played in three leagues: the NBL (1948–49), NBA (1949–50) and National Professional Basketball League (1950–51). He was one of the all-time great Redskins players, known for his hard-nosed play, rebounding prowess and scoring ability. In Brannum's final season with Sheboygan, when the Redskins finished with the NPBL's best record, he was selected first-team center after having the league's high scoring average (19.0 points per game). Brannum's 45-point barrage against the Kansas City Hi-Spots on December 28, 1950, was a franchise record, topping the 44 points Bobby Cook scored against the NBA's Denver Nuggets the previous January.

He spent the next four seasons with the Boston Celtics, with whom he earned a reputation as a hard-nosed, pugnacious player. Brannum often served as an unofficial "bodyguard" for smaller players on the team, especially point guard Bob Cousy. Cousy later remarked in an interview, "It was a great luxury to have Bob on the team, and to have him playing the role of protector.  It definitely made my job a lot easier."

Brannum retired as a player in 1955. He later coached basketball at Norwich University, Kenyon College and Brandeis University, where he won a school-record 204 games. Brannum also was the long-time golf coach at Brandeis University. He died of pancreatic cancer in 2005.

Brannum was inducted posthumously into the Kansas Sports Hall of Fame in 2013.

References

External links

1925 births
2005 deaths
All-American college men's basketball players
Basketball coaches from Kansas
American men's basketball players
College men's basketball head coaches in the United States
Basketball players from Kansas
Boston Celtics players
Brandeis Judges men's basketball coaches
Centers (basketball)
Deaths from pancreatic cancer
Kentucky Wildcats men's basketball players
Kenyon Lords basketball coaches
Michigan State Spartans men's basketball players
Norwich Cadets men's basketball coaches
People from Winfield, Kansas
Power forwards (basketball)
Sheboygan Red Skins players
Deaths from cancer in Massachusetts